Qutur Bolagh (also Romanized as Qūtūr Bolāgh; also known as Qoţūr Bolāgh) is a village in Qeshlaq-e Jonubi Rural District, Qeshlaq Dasht District, Bileh Savar County, Ardabil Province, Iran. At the 2006 census, its population was 184, in 38 families.

References 

Tageo

Populated places in Bileh Savar County
Towns and villages in Bileh Savar County